Legoland Discovery Center Chicago is an indoor family entertainment center located in The Streets of Woodfield shopping center in Schaumburg, Illinois. The attraction includes Lego-theme rides, a soft play area, a 4D cinema and a gift shop. Legoland Discovery Center Chicago is owned and operated by British leisure group Merlin Entertainments.

History
Lego bricks were invented by Danish carpenter Ole Kirk Kristiansen in 1958. Employees at the Lego factory in Billund, Denmark started to put Lego models outside. As these models became popular with visitors to the factory, it was decided to turn them into a tourist attraction - this became the first ever LEGOLAND. The first Legoland Discovery Center was opened in Berlin in 2007, and since then a total of 12 LEGOLAND® Discovery Centers have been opened. LEGOLAND® Discovery Center Chicago opened in 2008 and was the first LEGOLAND Discovery Center in North America. LEGOLAND Discovery Centers are small indoor attractions, whereas the LEGOLAND parks are large outdoor theme parks with rollercoasters.

Rides & Attractions 
 A lego replica of the local area in MINILAND®
 A Jungle Expedition featuring life sized LEGO models of animals and a quiz trail
 Kingdom Quest Laser Ride where visitors must zap the ogres, rats and cats and keep an eye out for treasure chests
 LEGO® 4D Cinema showing 4D films featuring popular LEGO characters throughout the day
 LEGO® Master Builder Academy offering classes with LEGOLAND® Discovery Center's Master Model Builders
 An area where visitors can build and test LEGO cars
 Merlin's Apprentice Ride where visitors can pedal to lift off the ground and look over the rest of Legoland Discovery Center Chicago
 DUPLO® Village featuring a play slide, large animal models, and DUPLO bricks to build with
 Café serving food, drinks and snacks
 The LEGOLAND® Discovery Center Shop with over 900 products
 Birthday Rooms for exclusive use as part of LEGOLAND® Discovery Center's Party Package
 A new Pirate Adventure Island feature opened in June 2015. This replaced the old jungle gym. In the Pirate area, kids can build LEGO boats and race them on a water table.

References

External links
Official Website
Mocfunny Bricks

Legoland
Schaumburg, Illinois
Tourist attractions in Cook County, Illinois